Lianyungang railway station is a station in Haizhou District, Lianyungang, Jiangsu.

History

The station was established in 1925. The former site of the station was on Jiefang E. Road in the city center.

In 1998, the station was moved to the current site together with the relocation of Longhai railway out of Lianyungang city center.

The station was once named as Xinpu railway station. It was changed to the current name on 1 January 2004.

On 20 March 2015, the renovation and expansion project of the station started and the passenger services of the station was suspended. The former station building, opened in 1998, was demolished in 2016 to make room for new platforms and tracks.

References

Railway stations in Jiangsu
Stations on the Longhai Railway
Railway stations in China opened in 1925